The 2020–21 UCF Knights men's basketball team represents the University of Central Florida during the 2020–21 NCAA Division I men's basketball season. The Knights are members of the American Athletic Conference. The Knights, in the program's 52nd season of basketball, are led by fifth-year head coach Johnny Dawkins and play their home games at the Addition Financial Arena on the university's main campus in Orlando, Florida. They finished the season 11-12, 8-10 in AAC Play to finish in 6th place. They defeated East Carolina in the first round of the AAC tournament before losing in the quarterfinals to Memphis.

Previous season
The Knights finished the 2019–20 season 16–14 overall and 7–11 in AAC play to finish in eighth place. They entered as the No. 8 seed in the AAC tournament, which was ultimately cancelled due to the coronavirus pandemic.

Offseason

Departures

Incoming transfers

2020 recruiting class

Preseason

AAC preseason media poll

On October 28, The American released the preseason Poll and other preseason awards

Roster

Schedule and results
UCF will start a series with Michigan beginning this season in Ann Arbor, Michigan.

COVID-19 impact

Due to the ongoing COVID-19 pandemic, the Knights' schedule is subject to change, including the cancellation or postponement of individual games, the cancellation of the entire season, or games played either with minimal fans or without fans in attendance and just essential personnel.

The game vs. Oklahoma scheduled for November 28 was cancelled due to COVID-19 issues.
The game @ Tulsa rescheduled for March 2 was moved to Orlando.
The game vs. Tulsa originally scheduled for February 6 was moved to Tulsa.

Schedule

|-
!colspan=9 style=| Regular season

|-
!colspan=9 style=|American Athletic Conference tournament
|-

|-

Awards and honors

American Athletic Conference honors

All-AAC Third Team
Brandon Mahan
Darius Perry

All-AAC Freshman Team
Isaiah Adams

Source

References

UCF Knights men's basketball seasons
UCF
UCF Knights men's basketball
UCF Knights men's basketball